Harbang is a village and union parishad in Chakaria Upazila, Cox's Bazar District in the Chittagong Division in Bangladesh.

Notable residents

 Fazlul Karim, Bangladeshi lawyer
 Khan Bahadur Jalal Uddin Ahmad, eminent lawyer, social worker and Health Minister of Bengal in undivided India
 Mohammad Ziauddin, Military Officer, Freedom Fighter, Ex Charman Chittagong Development Authority

References

Villages in Cox's Bazar District
Unions of Chakaria Upazila